Chania Football Club is a Greek professional football club based in Chania, Crete, Greece. They were established in 2017, as a result of a merger between the two regional clubs representing the Chania district in the Greek Second Division, PGS Kissamikos and AO Chania. The club currently plays in the Super League 2, the second tier of the Greek football league system.

History

AO Chania – Kissamikos 

During the 2016–17 Greek Second Division season, Chania were represented in the Greek Second Division by two clubs, namely AO Chania of the city of Chania, and Kissamikos, based in the neighboring town of Kissamos. Kissamikos had quickly established itself in the Football League, managing to outgrow, and eventually outperform its more prestigious local competitor AO Chania. Facing insurmountable financial issues, AO Chania were forcibly relegated to the Gamma Ethniki at the end of the season after being deducted 33 points, while simultaneously having its licence revoked. In the summer of 2017, Kissamikos owner at the time Antonis Rokakis proposed a merger of the two clubs in an attempt to form a new, strong outfit to represent the region, and more specifically the city of Chania (as the region's competitor in the Greek Super League, Platanias is based in the neighboring town and municipality of Platanias). The initiative was eventually approved on 19 August 2017, however, any club that would result from a potential merger would inherit the financial obligations of AO Chania. As such, Kissamikos changed its name to AO Chania − Kissamikos, retaining its original crest and colors, while the club's home ground was relocated to Perivolia Municipal Stadium in Mournies, Chania. The entire merger was met with fierce opposition by the supporters of Kissamikos. On the other hand, supporters of AO Chania demanded Kissamikos' name and crest be completely erased, basically turning the club into a modern continuation of AO Chania.

The new club became serious competitors in the two years following the merger, finishing 4th during the 2017–18 season, and 6th in 2018–19, thus becoming eligible to play in the 2019-formed Super League 2.

PAE Chania 
In the summer of 2019, the club's board of directors changed the club's name to PAE Chania, indicating their intent to represent the entire Chania regional unit. The 2019–20 season saw Chania FC achieve its best result to date, finishing third in the Super League 2.

Stadium
After the merger, the club moved to AO Chania's Perivolia Municipal Stadium, a multi-purpose stadium in Mournies, Chania.

Players

Current squad

Personnel

Ownership and current board

|}

Coaching staff

|}

Medical and other staff

|}

References

External links
Official website 

 
PAE
Football clubs in Crete
Super League Greece 2 clubs